The rubyfish (Plagiogeneion rubiginosum) is a rover found from the southeastern Atlantic Ocean off South Africa through the Indian Ocean to the southwestern Pacific Ocean around Australia and New Zealand. It can reach a length of up to  TL. This species is commercially important.

References

 Tony Ayling & Geoffrey Cox, Collins Guide to the Sea Fishes of New Zealand,  (William Collins Publishers Ltd, Auckland, New Zealand 1982) 

Emmelichthyidae
Fish described in 1875